Aguas Zarcas volcanic field is a field of pyroclastic cones located in the Aguas Zarcas district, San Carlos canton of the Alajuela province, Costa Rica.

Physical aspects 
Located in the North flank of the Platanar Volcano, it is composed of at least nine cones, of which one is recognized as a hill and the remaining eight as hillocks.

The sides of the cones are slanted between 10 and 30 degrees, the cones have an elongated shape in the East to West direction and the complex runs in the direction North to South, evidence of tectonic origin.  Previous lava flow activity is appreciated in some of the cones.

Hill and hillocks of the volcanic field

See also
 List of volcanoes in Costa Rica

References

Mountains of Costa Rica